The Diocese of Allegheny is a former Roman Catholic diocese of the United States (1876–1889), in the state of Pennsylvania. It is currently an episcopal titular see, known in Latin as Dioecesis Alleghenensis.

History 
In November 1875, Bishop Michael Domenec of the Diocese of Pittsburgh traveled to Rome to request the division of the Diocese of Pittsburg, and the formation of a new diocese with Allegheny City as its see. Priests and people were taken by surprise when the division was announced.

The diocese was created on 11 January 1876 with territory split from the Diocese of Pittsburgh, as a fellow suffragan of the Metropolitan Archdiocese of Philadelphia. Domenec was appointed as its first ordinary, and missioner John Tuigg of Altoona, vicar-general of Pittsburgh, was appointed to succeed him in Pittsburgh.

The Panic of 1873 had been a financial disaster for the Pittsburgh diocese. The division was unpopular in Pittsburgh, as it complicated the financial situation and left those by institutions most in debt to the Pittsburgh diocese.

Bishop Domenec resigned the See of Allegheny 27 July, 1877, and retired to his native land, where he died at Tarragona, 7 January, 1878. Bishop John Tuigg, who was serving as Bishop of Pittsburgh, was appointed Apostolic Administrator.

On 1 July 1889, the see was suppressed as a residential diocese and its territory was reunited with the diocese of Pittsburgh.

Former territory 

Allegheny County was split unevenly between the two dioceses, with most of that county remaining in the Diocese of Pittsburgh.

The Rev. Andrew Lambing, an early historian of the Catholic Diocese of Pittsburgh, described the boundary lines as follows:

References and works cited
References

Works cited

Sources and external links
 GigaCatholic, with incumbent biographies
 New York Times story on the reconsolidation of the see with Pittsburgh (subscription required for full article)

Catholic titular sees in North America
History of Allegheny County, Pennsylvania
Catholic Church in Pennsylvania
Religious organizations established in 1876
1876 establishments in Pennsylvania